Szarki may refer to the following places:
Szarki, Greater Poland Voivodeship (west-central Poland)
Szarki, Lubusz Voivodeship (west Poland)
Szarki, Silesian Voivodeship (south Poland)
Szarki, Warmian-Masurian Voivodeship (north Poland)